Ognjen Ilić (born 21 November 1998 in Aranđelovac) is a Serbian cyclist.

Major results
2016
 2nd Time trial, National Junior Road Championships
2017
 4th Time trial, National Road Championships
2018
 2nd Time trial, National Road Championships
2019
 1st  Time trial, Balkan Road Championships
 1st  Time trial, National Road Championships
 5th Chrono des Nations U23
2020
 2nd Time trial, National Road Championships
2021
 1st  Time trial, National Road Championships
2022
 2nd Time trial, National Road Championships
 3rd  Time trial, Mediterranean Games

References

External links

1998 births
Living people
Serbian male cyclists
People from Aranđelovac
20th-century Serbian people
21st-century Serbian people
Mediterranean Games bronze medalists for Serbia
Competitors at the 2022 Mediterranean Games